Mabel Keaton Staupers (February 27, 1890 – September 30, 1989) was a pioneer in the American nursing profession. Faced with racial discrimination after graduating from nursing school, Staupers became an advocate for racial equality in the nursing profession.

Biography
Staupers was born on February 27, 1890, in Barbados, West Indies. In 1903, at the age of thirteen, she emigrated to the United States, Harlem, New York, with her parents, Pauline and Thomas Doyle and received American citizenship in 1917. She attended Freedmen's Hospital School of Nursing in Washington, DC, where she graduated with honors. After graduation, she worked as a private duty nurse.

Staupers fought for the inclusion of black nurses in World War II to the Army and Navy as the executive secretary of the National Association of Colored Graduate Nurses (NACGN). She wrote that "Negro nurses recognize that service to their country is a responsibility of citizenship." Staupers became the executive secretary of NACGN, and the main goal of the association was to advance the status of African American nurses, most of whom were barred from nursing schools and professional associations in a number of states. Staupers, along with the president of NACGN, Estelle Masse Riddle, led the struggle of black nurses to win full integration into the American nursing profession. Staupers was a great organizer and an astute political tactician whose focus was social change.

One of the major social changes led by Staupers and what she is known for today is playing a crucial role in the desegregation of the military's nursing corps during World War II. She continued fighting for the full inclusion of nurses of all races in the U.S. military, which was granted in January 1945 because at the time the military had a strict 56 black nurse quota to enter the service and it enforced segregated practices for those who were already in the service. Outraged by this, Staupers attacked the hypocrisy of Surgeon General Norman T. Kirk's plan to draft white women as nurses instead of qualified black nurses to meet the shortage of nurses in the military. In 1945, the U.S Army opened its Armed Forces Nurses Corps to all applicants regardless of race. In 1948, the American Nursing Association followed suit and allowed African-American nurses to become members after , Staupers dissolved the NAGCN because she believed the organization had completed its mission. In 1951, the NAACP honored Staupers with the Spingarn Medal in recognition of her efforts on behalf of black women workers.

During World War II, Staupers assembled support and fought to stop the usage of quotas in the military. Quotas were used in the military to restrict the number of black nurses the military hired.

While working as a private nurse in Washington and New York, Staupers helped establish the Booker T. Washington Sanatorium. It was the first and one of the few in-patient centers founded to care for African Americans who had tuberculosis, at a time when other hospitals refused black medical experts privileges or staffing positions. Staupers served as Superintendent for the Booker T. Washington Sanatorium from 1920 to 1922. She used her influence and management skills and became executive secretary of the Harlem Committee of the New York Tuberculosis and Health Association, a position she held for twelve years.  In December 1935, Staupers attended a gathering of African American women leaders, organized by Mary McLeod Bethune to establish the National Council of Negro Women.

References

External links 
 American Nurses Association 1996 Hall of Fame Inductee: Mabel Keaton Staupers
 African American Registry: Mabel Staupers was a nursing pioneer
 Mabel Staupers, 99, Leader for Nurses, Dies, New York Times, October 6, 1989.

1890 births
1989 deaths
Activists for African-American civil rights
American nurses
American women nurses
Barbadian emigrants to the United States
Spingarn Medal winners
20th-century American women
20th-century American people
African-American nurses